Lenham railway station serves Lenham in Kent, England.

The station, and all trains serving it, is operated by Southeastern.

History
The goods yard comprised four sidings on the down side and one on the up side. One of the down sidings served a goods shed, which was used by the Morello Cheery Works and a local bacon factory.

In 1961, loops were installed in both directions. Freight facilities were withdrawn on 6 January 1969. Although a new signal box was provided in 1961, it closed on 28 May 1984.

A new footbridge replaced the life-expired concrete footbridge spanning the tracks here, completed in early 2010.

Facilities
The station has a ticket office which is staffed during Monday-Saturday mornings only (06:20-13:00). At other times, the station is unstaffed and tickets can be purchased from the self-service ticket machine at the station.

There is a passenger waiting room which is open while the station is staffed as well as passenger help points on each platform.

The station has a small cycle rack at the entrance as well as a chargeable car park which is operated by Saba Parking.

The station has step-free access available to the Ashford although the London bound is only reachable by the use of steps and there is no access between the stations platforms.

Services
All services at Lenham are operated by Southeastern using  and  EMUs.

The typical off-peak service in trains per hour is:
 1 tph to  via  
 1 tph to 

During the peak hours, the station is served by an additional hourly service between London Victoria and Ashford International, increasing the service to 2 tph in each direction.

Bus Connections
The station is served by the Stagecoach South East route 10X bus which provides connections on all days of the week to Maidstone and Ashford.

References 

Sources

External links

Borough of Maidstone
Railway stations in Kent
DfT Category E stations
Former London, Chatham and Dover Railway stations
Railway stations in Great Britain opened in 1884
Railway stations served by Southeastern
1884 establishments in England